The following is a taxonomy of extant (living) Brachiopoda by Emig, Bitner & Álvarez (2019). There are over 400 living species and over 120 living genera of brachiopods classified within 3 classes and 5 orders, listed below. Extinct groups are not listed.

Major groups 
Phylum Brachiopoda Duméril, 1806
Subphylum Linguliformea Williams, Carlson, Brunton, Holmer et Popov, 1996
Class Lingulata Gorjansky et Popov, 1985
Order Lingulida Waagen, 1885
Subphylum Craniiformea Popov, Basset, Holmer et Laurie, 1993
Class Craniata Williams, Carlson, Brunton, Holmer et Popov, 1996
Order Craniida Waagen, 1885
Subphylum Rhynchonelliformea Williams, Carlson, Brunton, Holmer et Popov, 1996
Class Rhynchonellata Williams, Carlson, Brunton, Holmer et Popov, 1996
Order Rhynchonellida Kuhn, 1949
Order Thecideida Elliot, 1958
Order Terebratulida Waagen, 1883
Suborder Terebratulidina Waagen, 1883
Suborder Terebratellidina Muir-Wood, 1955

Order Lingulida
Subphylum Linguliformea Williams, Carlson, Brunton, Holmer et Popov, 1996, Class Lingulata Gorjansky et Popov, 1985

Order Lingulida Waagen, 1885
Superfamily Linguloidea Menke, 1828
Family Lingulidae Menke, 1828
 Genus Lingula Bruguière, 1791
 Lingula rostrum (Shaw, 1798)
 Lingula anatina Lamarck, 1801
 Lingula tumidula Reeve, 1841
 Lingula parva Smith, 1871
 Lingula adamsi Dall, 1873
 Lingula reevei Davidson, 1880
 Lingula translucida Dall, 1920
 Genus Glottidia Dall, 1870
 Glottidia semen (Broderip, 1833)
 Glottidia audebarti (Broderip, 1833)
 Glottidia albida (Hinds, 1844)
 Glottidia pyramidata (Stimpson, 1860)
 Glottidia palmeri Dall, 1871
Superfamily Discinoidea Gray, 1840
Family Discinidae Gray, 1840
 Genus Pelagodiscus Dall, 1908
 Pelagodiscus atlanticus (King, 1868)
 Genus Discina Lamarck, 1819
 Discina striata (Schumacher, 1817)
 Genus Discinisca Dall, 1871
 Discinisca laevis (Sowerby, 1822)
 Discinisca lamellosa (Broderip, 1834)
 Discinisca tenuis (Sowerby, 1847)
 Discinisca rikuzenensis (Hatai, 1940)
 Discinisca lamellosa sensu d'Hondt, 1976
 Genus Discradisca Stenzel, 1964
 Discradisca cumingii (Broderip, 1833)
 Discradisca strigata (Broderip, 1834)
 Discradisca antillarum (d'Orbigny, 1846)
 Discradisca stella (Gould, 1862)
 Discradisca sparselineata (Dall, 1920)
 Discradisca indica (Dall, 1920)

Order Craniida
Subphylum Craniiformea Popov, Basset, Holmer et Laurie, 1993, Class Craniata Williams, Carlson, Brunton, Holmer et Popov, 1996

Order Craniida Waagen, 1885
Superfamily Cranioidea Menke, 1828
Family Craniidae Menke, 1828
 Genus Novocrania Lee et Brunton, 2001
 Novocrania anomala (Müller, 1776)
 Novocrania turbinata (poli, 1795)
 Novocrania lecointei (Joubin, 1901)
 Novocrania huttoni (Thomson, 1916)
 Novocrania philippinensis (Dall, 1920)
 Novocrania chathamensis? (Allan, 1940)
 Novocrania roseoradiata (Jackson, 1952)
 Novocrania indonesiensis (Zezina, 1981)
 Novocrania altivertex Zezina, 1990
 Genus Valdiviathyris Helmcke, 1940
 Valdiviathyris quenstedti Helmcke, 1940
 Genus Neoancistrocrania Laurin, 1992
 Neoancistrocrania norfolki Laurin, 1992

Order Rhynchonellida
Subphylum Rhynchonelliformea Williams, Carlson, Brunton, Holmer et Popov, 1996, Class Rhynchonellata Williams, Carlson, Brunton, Holmer et Popov, 1996

Order Rhynchonellida Kuhn, 1949
Superfamily Pugnacoidea Rzhonsnitskaia, 1956
Family Basiliolidae Cooper, 1959
Subfamily Acanthobasiliolinae Zezina, 1981
 Genus Acanthobasiliola Zezina, 1981
 Acanthobasiliola doederleini (Davidson, 1886)
Subfamily Basiliolinae Cooper, 1959
 Genus Rhytirhynchia Cooper, 1957
 Rhytirhynchia sladeni (Dall, 1910)
 Genus Basiliolella d'Hondt, 1987
 Basiliolella grayi (Woodward, 1855)
 Basiliolella colurnus (Hedley, 1905)
 Genus Basiliola Dall, 1908
 Basiliola beecheri (Dall, 1895)
 Basiliola lucida (Gould, 1862)
 Basiliola pompholyx Dall, 1920
 Basiliola elongata Cooper, 1959
 Basiliola arnaudi Cooper, 1981
Subfamily Uncertain
 Genus Striarina Cooper 1973
 Striarina valdiviae (Helmcke, 1940)
Superfamily Dimerelloidea Buckman, 1912
Family Cryptoporidae Muir-Wood, 1955
 Genus Cryptopora Jeffreys 1869
 Cryptopora gnomon Jeffreys, 1869
 Cryptopora boettgeri Helmcke, 1940
 Cryptopora rectimarginata Cooper, 1959
 Cryptopora maldiviensis Muir-Wood, 1959
 Cryptopora curiosa Cooper, 1973
 Cryptopora hesperis Cooper, 1982
 Cryptopora norfolkensis Bitner, 2009
 Genus Aulites Richardson 1987
 Aulites brazieri (Crane, 1886)
 Aulites crosnieri Bitner, 2009
Superfamily Norelloidea Ager, 1959
Family Frieleiidae Cooper, 1959
Subfamily Freileiinae Cooper, 1959
 Genus Grammetaria Cooper, 1959
 Grammetaria bartschi (Dall, 1920)
 Grammetaria africana Hiller, 1986
 Grammetaria minuta Zezina, 1994
 Genus Frieleia Dall 1895
 Frieleia halli Dall, 1895
 Frieleia pellucida (Yabe et Hatai, 1934)
 Genus Compsothyris Jackson, 1918
 Compsothyris racovitzae (Joubin, 1901)
 Compsothyris ballenyi Foster, 1974
Subfamily Hispanirhynchiinae Cooper, 1959
 Genus Parasphenarina Motchurova-Dekova, Saito et Endo, 2002
 Parasphenarina cavernicola Motchuro-Dekova, Saito et Endo, 2002
 Parasphenarina ezogremena (Zezina, 1981)
 Genus Manithyris Foster, 1974
 Manithyris rossi Foster, 1974
 Genus Hispanirhynchia Thomson, 1927
 Hispanirhynchia cornea (Fischer, 1887)
 Genus Abyssorhynchia Zezina, 1980
 Abyssorhynchia craneana (Dall, 1895)
Subfamily Neorhynchiinae Mancenido et Owen, 2002
 Genus Neorhynchia Thomson, 1915
 Neorhynchia strebeli (Dall, 1908)
Family Tethyrhynchiidae Logan 1994, in Logan & Zibrowius (1994)
 Genus Tethyrhynchia Logan 1994, in Logan & Zibrowius (1994)
 Tethyrhynchia mediterranea Logan 1994, in Logan & Zibrowius (1994)
Superfamily Hemithiridoidea Rzhonsnitskaia, 1956
Family Hemithirididae Rzhonsnitskaia, 1956
 Genus Pemphixina Cooper, 1981
 Pemphixina pyxidata (Davidson, 1880)
 Genus Hemithiris d'Orbigny, 1847
 Hemithiris psittacea (Gmelin, 1790)
 Hemithiris woodwardi (Adams, 1863)
Family Notosariidae Mancenido et Owen, 2002
 Genus Notosaria Cooper, 1959
 Notosaria nigricans (Sowerby, 1846)
 Notosaria reinga Lee et Wilson, 1979

Order Thecideida
Subphylum Rhynchonelliformea Williams, Carlson, Brunton, Holmer et Popov, 1996, Class Rhynchonellata Williams, Carlson, Brunton, Holmer et Popov, 1996

Order Thecideida Elliot, 1958
Superfamily Thecideoidea Gray, 1840
Family Thecidellinidae Elliot, 1958
Subfamily Thecidellininae Elliot, 1953
 Genus Thecidellina Thomson, 1915
 Thecidellina barretti (Davidson, 1864)
 Thecidellina maxilla (Hedley, 1899)
 Thecidellina blochmanni Dall, 1920
 Thecidellina japonica (Hayasaka, 1938)
 Thecidellina congregata Cooper, 1954
 Thecidellina meyeri Hoffmann et Lüter, 2008
 Thecidellina bahamiensis Lüter, Hoffmann et Logan, 2008
 Thecidellina williamsi Lüter, Hoffmann et Logan, 2008
 Thecidellina insolita Hoffmann et Lüter, 2010
 Thecidellina europa Logan, Hoffmann et Lüter, 2015
 Thecidellina mawaliana Simon, Lüter, Logan et Mottequin, 2018
 Thecidellina leipnitzae Simon, Hiller, Logan et Mottequin, 2019
 Genus Kakanuiella Lee et Robinson, 2003
 Kakanuiella chathamensis Lüter, 2005
Subfamily Minutellinae Logan et Baker, 2013
 Genus Minutella Hoffmann et Lüter, 2010
 Minutella minuta (Cooper, 1981)
 Minutella tristani Hoffmann et Lüter, 2010
 Minutella bruntoni Hoffmann et Lüter, 2010
Family Thecideidae Gray, 1840
Subfamily Lacazellinae Backhaus, 1959
 Genus Lacazella Munier-Chalmas, 1880
 Lacazella mediterranea (Risso, 1826)
 Lacazella australis (Tate, 1880)
 Lacazella mauritiana Dall, 1920
 Lacazella caribbeanensis Cooper, 1977
 Genus Pajaudina Logan, 1988
 Pajaudina atlantica Logan, 1988
 Genus Ospreyella Lüter, 2003 in Lüter, Wörheide & Reitner (2003)
 Ospreyella depressa Lüter et Wörheide, 2003
 Ospreyella maldiviana Logan, 2005
 Ospreyella palauensis Logan, 2008
 Ospreyella mutiara Simon et Hoffmann, 2013
 Ospreyella mayottensis Simon, Hiller, Logan & Mottequin, 2019

Order Terebratulida
Subphylum Rhynchonelliformea Williams, Carlson, Brunton, Holmer et Popov, 1996, Class Rhynchonellata Williams, Carlson, Brunton, Holmer et Popov, 1996

Order Terebratulida Waagen, 1883

Suborder Terebratulidina
Suborder Terebratulidina Waagen, 1883
Superfamily Terebratuloidea Gray, 1840
Family Terebratulidae Gray, 1840
 Genus Ebiscothyris Bitner et Cohen, 2015
 Ebiscothyris bellonensis Bitner et Cohen, 2015
Subfamily Terebratulinae Gray, 1840
 Genus Acrobrochus Cooper 1983
 Acrobrochus vema (Cooper, 1973)
 Acrobrochus blochmanni (Jackson, 1912)
 Acrobrochus marotiriensis Bitner, 2007
 Genus Liothyrella Thomson 1916
 Liothyrella uva (Broderip, 1883)
 Liothyrella moseleyi (Davidson, 1878)
 Liothyrella winteri (Blochmann, 1906)
 Liothyrella neozelanica Thomson, 1918
 Liothyrella delsolari Cooper, 1982
Subfamily Gryphinae Sahni, 1929
 Genus Gryphus Megerle von Mühlfeld, 1811
 Gryphus vitreus (Born, 1778)
 Gryphus clarkeana Dall, 1895
 Gryphus tokionis Dall, 1920
 Gryphus capensis Jackson, 1952
Subfamily Tichosininae Cooper, 1983
 Genus Tichosina Cooper, 1977
 Tichosina floridensis Cooper, 1977
 Tichosina bartletti (Dall, 1882)
 Tichosina bartschi (Cooper, 1934)
 Tichosina abrupta Cooper, 1977
 Tichosina bahamiensis Cooper, 1977
 Tichosina bullisi Cooper, 1977
 Tichosina dubia Cooper, 1977
 Tichosina elongata Cooper, 1977
 Tichosina erecta Cooper, 1977
 Tichosina expansa Cooper, 1977
 Tichosina labiata Cooper, 1977
 Tichosina martinicensis Cooper, 1977
 Tichosina obesa Cooper, 1977
 Tichosina pillsburyae Cooper, 1977
 Tichosina plicata Cooper, 1977
 Tichosina rotundovata Cooper, 1977
 Tichosina solida Cooper, 1977
 Tichosina subtriangulata Cooper, 1977
 Tichosina truncata Cooper, 1977
 Genus Arctosia Cooper, 1983
 Arctosia arctica (Friele, 1877)
 Genus Dolichozygus Cooper, 1983
 Dolichozygus stearnsii (Dall et Pilsbry, 1891)
 Genus Dysedrosia Cooper, 1983
 Dysedrosia borneoensis (Dall, 1920)
 Genus Erymnia Cooper, 1977
 Erymnia muralifera Cooper, 1977
 Erymnia angustata Cooper, 1977
 Genus Zygonaria Cooper, 1983
 Zygonaria joloensis (Dall, 1920)
 Zygonaria davidsoni (Adams, 1867)
Subfamily Dallithyridinae Katz et Popov, 1974
 Genus Dallithyris Muir-Wood, 1959
 Dallithyris fulva (Blochmann, 1906)
 Dallithyris murrayi Muir-Wood, 1959
 Dallithyris dubia? Cooper, 1981
 Dallithyris pacifica Bitner, 2006
 Dallithyris tahitiensis Bitner, 2014
 Genus Kanakythyris Laurin, 1997
 Kanakythyris pachyrhynchos Laurin, 1997
 Genus Stenosarina Cooper 1977
 Stenosarina angustata Cooper, 1977
 Stenosarina nitens Cooper, 1977
 Stenosarina oregonae Cooper, 1977
 Stenosarina parva Cooper, 1977
 Stenosarina globosa Laurin, 1997
 Stenosarina lata Laurin, 1997
 Stenosarina davidsoni Logan, 1998 - now Stenosarina sphenoidea (Philippi, 1844)
 Stenosarina crosnieri (Cooper, 1983)
Superfamily Dyscolioidea Fischer et Oelhert, 1891
Family Dyscoliidae Fischer et Oelhert, 1891
Subfamily Dyscoliinae Fischer et Oelhert, 1891
 Genus Dyscolia Fischer et Oehlert, 1890
 Dyscolia wyvillei (Davidson, 1878)
 Dyscolia subquadrata (Jeffreys, 1878)
 Dyscolia johannisdavisi (Alcock, 1894)
 Dyscolia radiata Cooper, 1981
 Genus Goniobrochus Cooper, 1983
 Goniobrochus ewingi (Cooper, 1973)
Subfamily Aenigmathyridinae Cooper, 1983
 Genus Abyssothyris Thomson, 1927
 Abyssothyris wyvillei (Davidson, 1878)
 Genus Acrobelesia Cooper, 1983
 Acrobelesia cooperi (d'Hondt, 1976)
 Genus Xenobrochus Cooper, 1981
 Xenobrochus africanus (Cooper, 1973)
 Xenobrochus translucidus (Dall, 1920)
 Xenobrochus agulhasensis (Helmcke, 1939)
 Xenobrochus indianensis (Cooper, 1973)
 Xenobrochus anomalus Cooper, 1981
 Xenobrochus australis Cooper, 1981
 Xenobrochus naudei Hiller, 1994
 Xenobrochus rotundus Bitner, 2008
 Xenobrochus norfolkensis Bitner, 2011
Subfamily Uncertain
 Genus Oceanithyris Bitner et Zezina, 2013 in Bitner et al. (2013)
 Oceanithyris juveniformis Bitner et Zezina, 2013 in Bitner et al. (2013)
Superfamily Cancellothyridoidea Thomson, 1926
Family Cancellothyrididae Thomson, 1926
Subfamily Cancellothyridinae Thomson, 1926
 Genus Cancellothyris Thomson, 1926
 Cancellothyris hedleyi (Finlay, 1927)
 Genus Murravia Thomson, 1916
 Murravia exarata (Verco, 1910) in Blochmann (1910)
 Genus Surugathyris? Yabe et Hatai, 1934
 Surugathyris surugaensis Yabe et Hatai, 1934
 Genus Terebratulina d'Orbigny, 1847
 Terebratulina retusa (Linné, 1758)
 Terebratulina septentrionalis (Couthouy, 1838)
 Terebratulina japonica (Sowerby, 1846)
 Terebratulina abyssicola (Adams et Reeve, 1850)
 Terebratulina cumingii Davidson, 1852
 Terebratulina unguicula (Carpenter, 1864)
 Terebratulina cailleti Crosse, 1865
 Terebratulina crossei Davidson, 1882
 Terebratulina kiiensis Dall et Pilsbry, 1891
 Terebratulina radula Hedley, 1904
 Terebratulina valdiviae Blochmann, 1908
 Terebratulina cavata Verco, 1910
 Terebratulina hawaiiensis Dall, 1920
 Terebratulina callinome Dall, 1920
 Terebratulina reevei Dall, 1920
 Terebratulina photina Dall, 1920
 Terebratulina pacifica Yabe et Hatai, 1934
 Terebratulina kyusyuensis Yabe et Hatai, 1934
 Terebratulina kitakamiensis Hayasaka, 1938
 Terebratulina peculiaris Hatai, 1940
 Terebratulina sirahamensis Hatai, 1940
 Terebratulina meridionalis Jackson, 1952
 Terebratulina hataiana Cooper, 1973
 Terebratulina compressa Cooper, 1973
 Terebratulina austroamericana Zezina, 1981
 Terebratulina australis Bitner, 2006
Family Chlidonophoridae Muir-Wood, 1959
Subfamily Chlidonophorinae Muir-Wood, 1959
 Genus Chlidonophora Dall, 1903
 Chlidonophora incerta (Davidson, 1878)
 Chlidonophora chuni Blochmann, 1903
Subfamily Eucalathinae Muir-Wood, 1965
 Genus Eucalathis Fischer et Œhlert, 1890
 Eucalathis murrayi (Davidson, 1878)
 Eucalathis tuberata (Jeffreys, 1878)
 Eucalathis trigona (Jeffreys, 1878)
 Eucalathis ergastica Fischer et Œhlert, 1890
 Eucalathis rugosa Cooper, 1973
 Eucalathis fasciculata Cooper, 1973
 Eucalathis inflata Cooper, 1973
 Eucalathis macrorhynchus Forster, 1974
 Eucalathis cubensis Cooper, 1977
 Eucalathis floridensis Cooper, 1977
 Eucalathis magna Cooper, 1981
 Eucalathis daphneae Bitner et Logan, 2016
 Eucalathis malgachensis Bitner et Logan, 2016
 Genus Melvicalathis Lee, Lüter et Zezina, 2008, in Lee et al. (2008)
 Melvicalathis macroctena (Zezina, 1981)
 Genus Rectocalathis Seidel & Lüter, 2014
 Rectocalathis schemmgregoryi Seidel & Lüter, 2014)
 Genus Bathynanus Foster, 1974
 Bathynanus tenuicostatus Foster, 1974
 Bathynanus inversus Zezina, 1981
 Bathynanus rhizopodus Zezina, 1981
 Bathynanus dalli (Davidson, 1878)
 Genus Nanacalathis Zezina, 1981
 Nanacalathis minuta Zezina, 1981
 Nanacalathis atlantica Zezina 1991
 Genus Notozyga Cooper, 1977
 Notozyga lowenstami Cooper, 1977
 Notozyga gracilis Hiller, 1986
Subfamily Agulhasiinae Muir-Wood, 1965
 Genus Agulhasia King 1871
 Agulhasia davidsoni King, 1871
 Agulhasia densicostata Cooper, 1988
Family Cnismatocentridae Cooper, 1973
Subfamily Cnismatocentrinae Cooper, 1973
 Genus Cnismatocentrum Dall, 1920
 Cnismatocentrum sakhalinensis (Dall, 1908)
 Cnismatocentrum parvum Zezina, 1970

Suborder Terebratellidina
Suborder Terebratellidina Muir-Wood, 1955
Superfamily Zeillerioidea Allan, 1940
Family Zeilleriidae Allan, 1940
Subfamily Macandreviinae Cooper, 1973
 Genus Macandrevia King, 1859
 Macandrevia cranium (Müller, 1776)
 Macandrevia tenera (Jeffreys, 1876)
 Macandrevia americana Dall, 1895
 Macandrevia diamantina Dall, 1895
 Macandrevia bayeri Cooper, 1975
 Macandrevia africana Cooper, 1975
 Macandrevia emigi Bitner et Logan, 2016
Superfamily Kingenoidea Elliot, 1948
Family Kingenidae Elliot, 1948
Subfamily Ecnomiosinae Cooper, 1977
 Genus Ecnomiosa Cooper, 1977
 Ecnomiosa gerda Cooper, 1977
 Ecnomiosa inexpectata Cooper, 1981
Family Aulacothyropsidae Dagys, 1972
Subfamily Babukellinae MacKinnon, Smirnova et Lee, 2002
 Genus Fallax Atkins, 1960
 Fallax dalliniformis Atkins, 1960
 Fallax antarcticus Foster, 1974
 Fallax neocaledonensis (Laurin, 1997)
 Genus Septicollarina Zezina, 1981
 Septicollarina hemiechinata Zezina, 1981
 Septicollarina oceanica Zezina, 1990
 Septicollarina zezinae Bitner, 2009
Superfamily Laqueoidea Thomson, 1927
Family Laqueidae Thomson, 1927
Subfamily Laqueinae Thomson, 1927
 Genus Laqueus Dall, 1870
 Laqueus erythraeus Dall, 1920
 Laqueus rubellus (Sowerby, 1846)
 Laqueus suffusus (Dall, 1870)
 Laqueus jeffreysi Dall, 1877
 Laqueus blanfordi (Dunker, 1882)
 Laqueus vancouveriensis Davidson, 1887
 Laqueus morsei Dall, 1908
 Laqueus quadratus Yabe et Hatai, 1934
 Laqueus proprius Yabe et Hatai, 1934
 Laqueus orbicularis Yabe et Hatai, 1934
 Laqueus concentricus Yabe et Hatai, 1936
 Laqueus pacifica Hatai, 1936
 Laqueus pallidus Hatai, 1939
Subfamily Glaciarculinae MacKinnon et Lee, 2002
 Genus Glaciarcula Elliott, 1956
 Glaciarcula spitzbergensis (Davidson, 1852)
 Glaciarcula frieli (Davidson, 1878)
Family Frenulinidae Hatai, 1938
Subfamily Frenulininae Hatai, 1938
 Genus Frenulina Dall, 1894
 Frenulina sanguinolenta (Gmelin, 1790)
 Frenulina mauiensis Dall, 1920
 Frenulina cruenta Cooper, 1973
 Genus Jolonica Dall, 1920
 Jolonica hedleyi Dall, 1920
 Jolonica alcocki (Joubin, 1906)
 Jolonica nipponica Yabe et Hatai, 1934
 Jolonica suffusa (Cooper, 1973)
Subfamily Pictothyridinae Yabe et Hatai, 1941
 Genus Pictothyris Thomson, 1927
 Pictothyris picta (Dallwyn, 1817)
 Pictothyris elegans Yabe et Hatai, 1936
 Pictothyris laquaeformis Yabe et Hatai, 1936
Subfamily Shimodaiinae MacKinnon et Lee, 2006
 Genus Shimodaia MacKinnon, Saito et Endo, 1997
 Shimodaia pterygiota MacKinnon, Saito et Endo, 1997
 Shimodaia macclesfieldensis MacKinnon et Long, 2009
Family Terebrataliidae Richardson, 1975
Subfamily Terebrataliinae Richardson, 1975
 Genus Terebratalia Beecher, 1895
 Terebratalia transversa (Sowerby, 1846)
 Terebratalia coreanica (Adams et Reeve, 1850)
 Terebratalia gouldi (Dall, 1891)
 Terebratalia xanthica (Dall, 1920)
 Genus Coptothyris Jackson, 1918
 Coptothyris grayii (Davidson, 1852)
 Genus Dallinella Thomson, 1915
 Dallinella obsoleta (Dall, 1891)
 Genus Diestothyris Thomson, 1916
 Diestothyris frontalis (Middendorff, 1849)
 Diestothyris tisimania (Nomura et Hatai, 1936)
 Genus Tythothyris Zezina, 1979
 Tythothyris rosimarginata Zezina, 1979
Superfamily Uncertain
Family Uncertain
 Genus Simplicithyris Zezina, 1976
 Simplicithyris kurilensis Zezina, 1976
 Simplicithyris japonica (Dall, 1920)
 Genus Holobrachia Zezina, 2001
 Holobrachia vietnamica Zezina, 2001
Superfamily Megathyridoidea Dall, 187
Family Megathyrididae Dall, 18700
 Genus Megathiris d'Orbigny, 1847
 Megathiris detruncata (Gmelin, 1791)
 Megathiris capensis Jackson, 1952
 Genus Argyrotheca Dall, 1900
 Argyrotheca cuneata (Risso, 1826)
 Argyrotheca cistellula (Wood, 1841)
 Argyrotheca barrettiana (Davidson, 1866)
 Argyrotheca woodwardiana (Davidson, 1866)
 Argyrotheca schrammi (Crosse et Fischer, 1866)
 Argyrotheca rubrotincta (Dall, 1871)
 Argyrotheca lutea (Dall, 1871)
 Argyrotheca australis (Blochmann, 1910)
 Argyrotheca bermudana Dall, 1911
 Argyrotheca johnsoni Cooper, 1934
 Argyrotheca lowei Hertlein et Grant, 1944
 Argyrotheca somaliensis Cooper, 1973
 Argyrotheca jacksoni Cooper, 1973
 Argyrotheca thurmanni Cooper, 1973
 Argyrotheca crassa Cooper, 1977
 Argyrotheca hewatti Cooper, 1977
 Argyrotheca rubrocostata Cooper, 1977
 Argyrotheca grandicostata Logan, 1983
 Argyrotheca angulata Zezina, 1987
 Argyrotheca neocaledonensis Bitner, 2010
 Argyrotheca furtive Simon, 2010
 Argyrotheca cooperi Bitner et Logan, 2013
 Genus Joania Álvarez, Brunton et Long, 2008
 Joania cordata (Risso, 1826)
 Joania mayi Blochmann, 1914
 Joania arguta Grant, 1983
Family Thaumatosiidae Cooper, 1973
 Genus Thaumatosia Cooper, 1973
 Thaumatosia anomala Cooper, 1973
Superfamily Bouchardioidea Allan, 1940
Family Bouchardiidae Allan, 1940
 Genus Bouchardia Davidson, 1850
 Bouchardia rosea (Mawe, 1823)
Superfamily Platidioidea Dall, 1870
Family Platidiidae Dall, 1870
Subfamily Platidiinae Dall, 1870
 Genus Platidia Costa, 1852
 Platidia anomioides (Scacchi et Philippi, 1844 in Philippi, 1844)
 Platidia clepsidra Cooper, 1973
 Genus Amphithyris Thomson, 1918
 Amphithyris buckmani Thomson, 1918
 Amphithyris seminula (Philippi, 1836)
 Amphithyris hallenttensis Foster, 1974
 Amphithyris richardsonae Campbell et Fleming, 1981
 Amphithyris parva Mackinnon, Hiller, Long et Marshall, 2008
 Amphithyris cavernicola Nauendorf, Wörheide & Lüter, 2014
 Amphithyris comitodensis Nauendorf, Wörheide & Lüter, 2014
 Genus Neoaemula Mackinnon, Hiller, Long et Marshall, 2008
 Neoaemula vector Mackinnon, Hiller, Long et Marshall, 2008
 Genus Annuloplatidia Zezina, 1981
 Annuloplatidia indopacifica Zezina, 1981
 Annuloplatidia horni (Gabb, 1861)
 Annuloplatidia annulata (Atkins, 1959)
 Annuloplatidia richeri Bitner, 2009
 Annuloplatidia curiosa Bitner, 2014
Subfamily Phaneroporinae Zezina, 1981
 Genus Phaneropora Zezina, 1981
 Phaneropora galatheae Zezina, 1981
 Genus Leptothyrella Muir-Wood, 1965
 Leptothyrella incerta (Davidson, 1878)
 Leptothyrella ignota (Muir-Wood, 1959)
 Leptothyrella fijiensis Bitner, 2008
Superfamily Terebratelloidea King, 1850
Family Terebratellidae King, 1850
Subfamily Terebratellinae King, 1850
 Genus Terebratella d'Orbigny, 1847
 Terebratella dorsata (Gmelin, 1790)
 Terebratella crenulata Sowerby, 1846
 Terebratella labradorensis Sowerby, 1846
 Terebratella tenuis Tort, 2003
 Genus Magasella Dall, 1840
 Magasella sanguinea (Leach, 1814)
 Magasella haurakiensis (Allan, 1931)
 Genus Aerothyris Allan, 1939
 Aerothyris macquariensis (Thomson, 1918)
 Aerothyris kerguelensis (Davidson, 1878)
 Genus Aneboconcha Cooper, 1973
 Aneboconcha obscura Cooper, 1973
 Aneboconcha smithii (Pfeffer, 1886)
 Aneboconcha eichleri (Allan, 1939) - see also Aerothyris kerguelensis
 Genus Calloria Cooper et Lee, 1993
 Calloria inconspicua (Sowerby, 1846)
 Calloria variegata Cooper et Doherty, 1993
 Genus Dyscritosia Cooper, 1982
 Dyscritosia secreta Cooper, 1982
 Genus Fosteria Zezina, 1980
 Fosteria spinosa (Foster, 1974)
 Genus Gyrothyris Thomson, 1918
 Gyrothyris mawsoni Thomson, 1918
 Gyrothyris williamsi Bitner, Cohen, Long, Richer de Forges et Saito, 2008
 Genus Neothyris Douvillé, 1879
 Neothyris lenticularis (Deshayes, 1839)
 Neothyris ovalis (Hutton, 1886)
 Neothyris westpacifica Zezina, 2001
 Genus Syntomaria Cooper, 1982
 Syntomaria curiosa Cooper, 1982
Subfamily Anakineticinae Richardson, 1991
 Genus Anakinetica Richardson, 1987
 Anakinetica cumingii (Davidson, 1852)
 Genus Parakinetica Richardson, 1987
 Parakinetica stewarti Richardson, 1987
Subfamily Magellaniinae Beecher, 1895
 Genus Magellania Bayle, 1880
 Magellania flavescens (Lamarck, 1819)
 Magellania venosa (Solander, 1786)
 Magellania joubini Blochmann, 1906
 Magellania fragilis Smith, 1907
Subfamily Uncertain
 Genus Magadinella Thomson, 1915
 Magadinella mineuri Richardson, 1987
 Genus Pirothyris Thomson, 1927
 Pirothyris vercoi (Blochmann, 1910)
Family Dallinidae Beecher, 1895
Subfamily Dallininae Beecher, 1895
 Genus Dallina Beecher, 1895
 Dallina septigera (Lovén, 1845)
 Dallina raphaelis (Dall, 1870)
 Dallina triangularis Yabe et Hatai, 1934
 Dallina floridana (Pourtalès, 1867)
 Dallina obessa Yabe et Hatai, 1934
 Dallina elongata Hatai, 1940
 Dallina profundis Konjukova, 1957
 Dallina eltanini Foster, 1974
 Dallina parva Cooper, 1981
Subfamily Nipponithyridinae Hatai, 1938
 Genus Nipponithyris Yabe et Hatai, 1934
 Nipponithyris nipponensis Yabe et Hatai, 1934
 Nipponithyris afra Cooper, 1973
 Nipponithyris lauensis Bitner, 2008
 Genus Campages Heydley, 1905
 Campages mariae (Adams, 1860)
 Campages furcifera (Hedley, 1905)
 Campages asthenia (Dall, 1920)
 Campages nipponensis Yabe et Hatai, 1935
 Campages dubius Hatai, 1940
 Campages japonica (Hatai, 1940)
 Campages pacifica (Hatai, 1940)
 Campages ovalis Bitner, 2008
 Genus Jaffaia Thomson, 1927
 Jaffaia jaffaensis (Blochmann, 1910)
Superfamily Kraussinoidea Dall, 1870
Family Kraussinidae Dall, 1870
Subfamily Kraussininae Dall, 1870.
 Genus Kraussina Davidson, 1859
 Kraussina rubra (Pallas, 1766)
 Kraussina cognata (Sowerby, 1847)
 Kraussina gardineri Dall, 1910
 Kraussina mercatori Helmcke, 1939
 Kraussina crassicostata Jackson, 1952
 Genus Megerlina Deslongchamps, 1884
 Megerlina lamarckiana (Davidson, 1852)
 Megerlina pisum (Lamarck, 1819)
 Megerlina natalensis (Krauss, 1843)
 Megerlina capensis (Adams et Reeve, 1850)
 Megerlina davidsoni (Vélain, 1877)
 Megerlina atkinsoni (Woods, 1878)
 Megerlina striata Jackson, 1952
 Genus Pumilus Atkins, 1958
 Pumilus antiquatus Atkins, 1958
 Genus Megerella Bitner et Logan, 2016
 Megerella hilleri Bitner et Logan, 2016
Subfamily Megerliinae Hiller, Mackinnon et Nielsen, 2008
 Genus Megerlia King, 1850
 Megerlia truncata (Linné, 1767)
 Megerlia granosa Seguenza, 1865
 Megerlia acrura Hiller, 1986
 Genus Lenticellaria Simon, Logan et Mottequin, 2016
 Lenticellaria gregoryi Simon, Logan et Mottequin, 2016
 Lenticellaria marerubris Simon, Logan et Mottequin, 2016
 Genus Hillerella Simon, Logan et Mottequin, 2016
 Hillerella bisepta Simon, Logan et Mottequin, 2016

Suborder Uncertain
Suborder Uncertain
Superfamily Gwynioidea MacKinnon, 2006
 Genus Gwynia King, 1859
 Gwynia capsula (Jeffreys, 1859)
 Gwynia macrodentata Lüter, 2008
 Genus Simpliciforma Bitner et Zezina, 2013 in Bitner et al. (2013)
 Simpliciforma profunda Bitner et Zezina, 2013 in Bitner et al. (2013)

See also
List of brachiopod genera
List of brachiopod species
Evolution of brachiopods

References

Systems of animal taxonomy